This is the discography of Swiss electronic music band Yello.

Albums

Studio albums

Live albums

Compilation albums

Box sets

Remix albums

Promotional albums

Singles

Videos

Video albums

Music videos

Notes

References

Discographies of Swiss artists
Electronic music discographies